La patota (Lunfardo for "The gang" or "The mob") is a 1960 Argentine black-and-white drama film directed by Daniel Tinayre. The film focuses on Paula Vidal Ugarte (Legrand), a young attractive teacher who takes a professorship at a night school located in a marginal area of Buenos Aires, where is she is gang-raped by a group of students.

La patota was written by Eduardo Borrás and starred Tinayre's wife Mirtha Legrand. The film was in competition for the Golden Bear at the 11th Berlin International Film Festival, where Tinayre was given the C.I.D.A.L.C. Award. Now considered a modern movie classic, La patota was remade as Paulina by director Santiago Mitre in 2015, with Dolores Fonzi playing the main role.

Cast
In alphabetical order
 Miguel Beleirén - Alumno
 André Braillard - Alumno
 Alfonso De Grazia - Hombre en fiesta de graduación
 Rafael Diserio - Médico
 Patricio Farrell - Tito
 Haydeé Larroca - Profesora 1
 María Cristina Laurenz - Mujer en fiesta de graduación
 Carmen Llambí - Telefonista
 Juan Longobuco - Alumno
 Gaston Marchetto - Alumno Morales
 Susana Mayo - Enfermera
 Alberto Puig - Alumno
 Julio C. Quino - Raúl
 Rogelio Romano - Policia
 Sara Suter - Profesora 2
 Isidro Fernán Valdez - Don Anselmo
 Néstor Zabrini - Alumno

Accolades

References

External links 
 

1960 films
1960s Spanish-language films
Argentine black-and-white films
Films about rape
Films directed by Daniel Tinayre
1960s Argentine films